The Ukrainian Spotted Steppe (Ukrajinska stepowa ryaba poroda) is a lard-type pig breed from Ukraine.

External links
 http://www.fao.org/docrep/009/ah759e/AH759E10.htm

Literature   
 Українська степова ряба порода свиней. // Українська радянська енциклопедія: [у 12-ти т.] / гол. ред. М. П. Бажан ; редкол.: О. К. Антонов та ін. — 2-ге вид. — К. : Головна редакція УРЕ, 1974–1985. 

Pig breeds originating in Ukraine
Animal breeds originating in the Soviet Union